Oleksii (Alexei) Shumskyi (born 3 October 1990) is a competitive ice dancer. Competing for Ukraine with Anastasia Galyeta, he won four medals on the ISU Junior Grand Prix series and placed as high as 8th at the World Junior Championships. With Lolita Yermak, he is the 2014 International Cup of Nice bronze medalist. In 2015, he began competing for Georgia with Tatiana Kozmava.

Career

Early career 
Shumskyi debuted on the ISU Junior Grand Prix series in 2004 with Ksenia Ponomareva. In 2005, he teamed up with Anastasia Vykhodtseva. They competed in four seasons of the JGP series, winning two bronze medals, before parting ways in autumn 2008.

Partnership with Galyeta 
Shumskyi teamed up with Anastasia Galyeta in November 2008. After becoming the Ukrainian junior silver medalists, they were assigned to the 2009 World Junior Championships, where they finished 23rd. They placed eighth the following year at the 2010 World Junior Championships. In their third season, Galyeta/Shumskyi won silver and bronze medals on the JGP series, qualified for the JGP Final, where they finished seventh, and placed 13th at the 2011 World Junior Championships. During their last season together, 2011–12, they won two silver medals on the JGP series and placed 5th at the JGP Final but were later disqualified due to Galyeta's positive doping sample.

In February 2012, it was reported that Galyeta and Shumskyi had parted ways.

Later partnerships 
Shumskyi skated with Anastasia Kabanova in the 2012–13 season, placing fourth on the senior level at the Ukrainian Championships.

Shumskyi began competing with Lolita Yermak in the 2013–14 season, taking the bronze medal at the Ukrainian Championships in December 2013. In 2014–15, the two won bronze at the International Cup of Nice and silver at the Ukrainian Championships. Their last competition together was the 2015 Winter Universiade, where they placed 9th.

Switch to Georgia
Shumskyi began competing with Tatiana Kozmava for Georgia in the 2015–16 season.

Programs

With Kozmava

With Yermak

With Galyeta

With Vykhodtseva

Competitive highlights 
CS: Challenger Series; JGP: Junior Grand Prix

With Kozmava for Georgia

With Yermak for Ukraine

With Kabanova for Ukraine

With Galyeta for Ukraine

With Vykhodtseva for Ukraine

With Ponomareva for Ukraine

References

External links 

 
 

Ukrainian male ice dancers
Male ice dancers from Georgia (country)
1990 births
Living people
Sportspeople from Odesa
Competitors at the 2015 Winter Universiade